Meryla is a locality in the Southern Highlands of New South Wales, Australia, in Wingecarribee Shire. It is located in the Meryla State Forest.

At the 2021 census, the population had increased to 9.

References

Towns of the Southern Highlands (New South Wales)